Laulauga Tausaga-Collins (born 22 May 1998 in Hawaii) is an American discus thrower. With a throw of 63.71 m (Minsk, 2019), her personal best, she has qualified for the 2020 Olympic Games. She improved her best to 63.94 m for qualifying to the final at the 2019 World Athletics Championships in Doha.

Professional
Tausaga made the women's discus final at 2019 world championships, won silver medals in discus at the 2019 match and 2019 NACAC U-23 Championships. Tausaga won discus at 2017 Pan American U20 Athletics Championships.

International

USA National championships

University of Iowa
Laulauga Tausaga-Collins is a 2019 NCAA Discus champion, 8-time NCAA Division 1 All-American, 6-time Big Ten Conference champion, & 12-time All-Big Ten Conference scorer.

Prep
At the 2015 CIF California State Meet, she placed 3rd in the shot put .

References

External links
IAAF profile
profile World Athletics
Laulauga Tausaga-Collins profile USATF
Lagi Tausaga's profile Iowa Hawkeyes

American female discus throwers
1998 births
Living people
Iowa Hawkeyes women's track and field athletes
Track and field athletes from Hawaii
American female shot putters
American female hammer throwers
World Athletics Championships athletes for the United States
Sportspeople from Hawaii
People from Hawaii
People from Spring Valley, San Diego County, California
American women's volleyball players
American women's basketball players
University of Iowa alumni